The Edenton-class salvage and rescue ship was a class of salvage and rescue ships that were operated by the United States Navy during the 1970s.

Design 
Edenton-class was a ship class consisting of three purposed built rescue ships, where they were brought into service in the 1970s. This class of ships were succeeded by the Navajo-class, as the designation ATS-4 and 5 were not used.

The ships were armed with two M242 Busmaster and two M2 Browning machine guns for self-defense.

Ships in the class

See also

 Salvage and rescue ship
 List of ships of the Republic of Korea Navy
 Brooke Marine

References

Gulf War ships of the United States
Edenton-class salvage and rescue ships
Ships built in Lowestoft